Jasiel Amon Robinson (born September 20, 1980), better known by his stage name Yung Joc, is an American rapper. He is best known for his 2006 hit single "It's Goin' Down", and as a feature on T-Pain's 2007 U.S. number-one single "Buy U a Drank (Shawty Snappin')".

Early life
Robinson's father owned a hair-care products company and helped him get an opportunity to write a jingle for Revlon. Robinson then founded his own label "Mastermind" to release his music.

Music career

New Joc City (2005–2006)
Robinson met Atlanta producer Nitti Beatz and the two recorded the hit "It's Goin Down" in the spring of 2005. After teaming with Russell "Block" Spencer, founder of the Block Enterprises label, Spencer signed Robinson to Sean Combs's Bad Boy South for a multimillion-dollar deal, and Bad Boy released Robinson's debut New Joc City that year.

Robinson was also featured on the songs "Show Stopper" by Danity Kane (from Diddy's Making The Band 4) & Cassie's album track Call U Out. Robinson was on 2006 "Forbes' Richest Rappers List", ranking at No. 20, having grossed approximately $10 million that year. "It's Goin' Down" reached No. 3 on the Billboard Hot 100 and No. 1 on the Hot Rap Tracks chart. The next single, "I Know U See It", reached No. 17 on the Hot 100 and No. 2 on the Hot Rap Tracks.

Hustlenomics (2007–2009)

Robinson 's next album, Hustlenomics, was released in 2007, with the singles "Coffee Shop" (featuring The-Dream and Gorilla Zoe) and "Bottle Poppin'" (featuring Gorilla Zoe). Hustlenomics sold 69,000 copies in its first week of release, debuting at number three on the Billboard 200. As of April 2009, it had sold approximately 197,000 copies according to Nielsen Soundscan. In 2007, Robinson was featured "Lookin Boy", a song by his protégés and label signees, hip hop group Hotstylz. In 2008, Robinson was featured in the hit singles on "Get Like Me" by David Banner, "So Fly" by Slim and "Beep" by Bobby V. In 2009, he was featured on Day26 single "Imma Put It on Her". Robinson released a mixtape entitled Grind Flu for free on his label Swagg Team Entertainment on August 11, 2009.

Mr. Robinson's Neighborhood (2010–2014)
Robinson released his first single from the album Mr. Robinson's Neighborhood entitled "Yeah Boy" in 2010. They have also shot & released the music video for the single.

On October 7, 2012, RCA Music Group announced it was disbanding J Records along with Arista Records and Jive Records. With the shutdown, Robinson (and all other artists previously signed to these three labels) were to release his future material (including Mr. Robinson's Neighborhood) on the RCA Records brand.

On March 18, 2014, Robinson released his first official single entitled "I Got Bitches" from his upcoming third album. On September 11, 2014, Robinson released his second single from his upcoming album entitled "Features" featuring former collaborator & singer T-Pain.

Other ventures

Swagg Team Entertainment

In 2010, Robinson formed a new record label through Jive Records, called Swagg Team Entertainment, after a widely publicized lawsuit with Block Entertainment and Bad Boy South. Robinson spoke about the lawsuit and his relationship with Diddy in an interview in 2015.

Swagg Team Entertainment saw their debut from Chicago rap group Hotstylz; with their first single "Lookin Boy". It also saw the debut from Dallas rap group GS Boyz; their first single being "Stanky Legg".

Current artists
 Hotstylz (Krazee, Meatball & Raydio G)
 Soufside
 Prince Charming
 Myk G Mr 16 Bars
 Kidd Starr
Former groups
 GS Boyz (Marc D, Slizz & DK)

Reality Television
Since 2014, Robinson joined the VH1 reality series Love & Hip Hop: Atlanta as a supporting cast member. In August 2017, it was announced that Robinson would compete in the first season of VH1's Scared Famous, which premiered on October 23, 2017.

Personal life

In December 2011, Robinson's recording studio for his label Swagg Team was robbed, and the criminals took about $70,000 worth of studio equipment along with a hard drive containing Robinson's unreleased music for his third studio album. It later was announced that one of the robbers identity was revealed by Robinson. Robinson knew one of the robbers named "Honcho" of Thomaston, Georgia.

As of 2022, Robinson has nine children by five women.

In January 2020, Robinson was filmed driving for a rideshare company called Pull Up N Go, leading to speculation that he had fallen on hard times financially. He later spoke out against these claims, stating that he was doing this in order to show children the value of hard work as part of his volunteering with Big Brothers Big Sisters of Metro Atlanta. 

He married Love & Hip Hop: Atlanta star Kendra Robinson on Sunday, November 7, 2021.

Legal issues
On May 18, 2009, it was announced that Robinson was suing his starter labels Block Entertainment & Bad Boy Entertainment due to unpaid royalties of his music. Eventually, however, Diddy & Robinson settled their differences. Little is known as to whether Robinson settled his differences with Block entertainment.

In 2012, Robinson (along with Block Entertainment & Bad Boy Entertainment) was sued by local Atlanta record label Master Mind Music, for breach of contract and copyright infringement.

Controversy

On Gucci Mane's song "Fuck the World" there was a controversial line when he rapped "I got all eyes on me like Pac did, but I ain't tryin' to go broke like Joc did." During a radio conversation Robinson responded to the song by stating "Gucci is a master at getting his name in other people's mouths, I ain't trippin', I know what my financial situation is".

Discography

 New Joc City (2006)                  
 Hustlenomics (2007)
 The Grind Flu (2009)
 Mr. Robinson's Neighborhood (2017)

Filmography

Awards

BET Hip Hop Awards
Yung Joc has won one award for his six nominations.
 2006: Rookie of the Year (Nominated)
 2006: Best Live Performer (Nominated)
 2006: Hip-Hop Dance of the Year (Nominated)
 2006, Hip-Hop Track of the Year: It's Goin' Down (Won)
 2006, Hip-Hop MVP of the Year (Nominated)
 2008, Hip-Hop Video of the Year: Get Like Me with David Banner & Chris Brown (Nominated)

Billboard Music Awards
Yung Joc has 3 nominations.
 2006: Rap Songs Artist of the Year (Nominated)
 2006: Top Rap Artist (Nominated)
 2006: Top R&B Song: It's Goin' Down (Nominated)

Grammy Awards
Yung Joc had received for his first nomination including Best Rap Song.
2007: Best Rap Song: It's Goin' Down (Nominated)

MTV Video Music Awards
Yung Joc had three nominations.
2006: Best Rap Video: It's Goin' Down (Nominated)
2006: MTV2 Award: It's Goin' Down (Nominated)
2007: Monster Single of the Year: Buy U a Drank (Shawty Snappin') (Nominated)

Soul Train Music Awards
Yung Joc has 2 nominations.
2007: Best R&B/Soul or Rap Dance Cut: It's Goin' Down (Nominated)
2007: Best R&B/Soul or Rap New Artist (Nominated)

References

External links 

 
 Yung Joc Albums

1980 births
Living people
African-American businesspeople
African-American Christians
African-American male rappers
American music industry executives
Bad Boy Records artists
Businesspeople from Georgia (U.S. state)
People from College Park, Georgia
Rappers from Atlanta
Rappers from Georgia (U.S. state)
RCA Records artists
Southern hip hop musicians
Participants in American reality television series
21st-century American rappers
21st-century American male musicians